Stewart Alexander Lowe (24 December 1958 – 5 October 1999) was an American mountaineer. He has been described as inspiring "...a whole generation of climbers and explorers with his uncontainable enthusiasm, legendary training routines, and significant ascents of rock climbs, ice climbs, and mountains all over the world...". He died in an avalanche in mount  Shishapangma, in Tibet. The Alex Lowe Charitable Foundation honors his legacy.

Biography 
Lowe was widely admired by his peers for excelling in every aspect of mountaineering, from rock- and ice-climbing to ski descents. Dave Hahn once remarked, "There's Alex Lowe up here, and then there's the rest of us down here. The guy's just really that much better than everybody else." Conrad Anker said, "We're all at this one level, and then there's Alex." Lowe himself said "The best climber in the world is the one having the most fun!"

Lowe improved his upper body strength as a result of a daily exercise regimen that included 400 chin-ups and hundreds of dips.  In an article for Active Lifestyle, Gordon Wiltsie, a photographer who climbed with Lowe in Antarctica and Canada's Baffin Island, said, "he'd hog the pull-up bar to knock out 400 pull-ups in sets of 40 and 45. He disliked downtime and knew where to do pull-ups in many airports. Even on expeditions, when rest is hard to come by and much appreciated, Lowe was an oddball. He'd cop pull-ups on a ship's rigging en route to Antarctica, or do dips in a snow pit he dug at base camp." In that article, Wiltsie said, "At Baffin Island, after hauling supplies to a high point on a climb, we went back to camp beat and tired, but Alex proceeded to do pull-up after pull-up. He even brought an exercise device on climbs." He was known jokingly as "Lungs With Legs" and "The Mutant" for his incredible strength and stamina.

Rescue on Denali 
In June 1995, Lowe helped the National Park Service rescue several Spanish climbers on  Denali in Alaska. Before a rescue team could assemble, one of the climbers fell  to his death from the mountain's Upper West Rib. The surviving climbers were all suffering from hypothermia. Lowe, Mark Twight and Scott Backes were lifted by military helicopter to a plateau above the Spaniards, scaled down a 400-vertical foot, 50-degree slope of ice and rock, to reach them and determined that one needed immediate evacuation. Amid snowy conditions, he at first dragged, then carried him on his back up the steep slope at high altitude.

Death on Shishapangma 

In September 1999, Lowe, Conrad Anker and David Bridges (a two-time US national paragliding champion) traveled to the  Himalayan giant Shishapangma, the fourteenth highest peak in the world, as part of the 1999 American Shishapangma Ski Expedition.

Plans called for Lowe and Anker to be part of the team that would ski down, to become the first Americans to ski down from the summit of an 8,000-meter peak; while Bridges was part of a three-man film team that was to shoot an NBC documentary of the expedition for The North Face. Lowe commented:
It's been a passionate goal of mine to ski off an 8,000 meter peak. I guess there's a lot of people sort of looking to do this and try to ski off Everest. But for me, it's got to be an aesthetic and quality run. And Shishapangma has the best ski line of any of the 8,000 meter peaks. It's just an absolutely straight shot right down the Southwest Face. That's going to be a good one.

On 5 October, they split into two teams as they searched for a route up the mountain. The -wide avalanche swept over the three men. Neither body was found at the time, but almost seventeen years later on 27 April 2016, climbers Ueli Steck and David Göttler, came across the remains of the two climbers emerging from the glacier.

Memorial fund 
Lowe was survived by his wife Jennifer and three sons, Max, Sam, and Isaac. The Alex Lowe Charitable Foundation was established in his honor to provide direction and financial support to humanitarian programs in mountain regions around the world. Their work includes the Khumbu Climbing Center for indigenous people of Nepal.

Jennifer Lowe-Anker published a memoir, Forget Me Not in 2008, that recounts her life shared with Lowe, his death and the life she continued with Anker. Forget Me Not won the National Outdoor Book award for literature in 2008.

Legacy 
In 1995, Lowe received the American Alpine Club's Underhill Award for outstanding mountaineering achievement, the highest honor in U.S. mountaineering. He climbed for nearly 10 years with The North Face professional climbing team, which included in the later years mountaineer Jon Krakauer, author of the bestseller Into Thin Air.  After Lowe's death, Outside Magazine posthumously declared him "the world's best climber," adding, "No matter how jaw-dropping his routes, Lowe's real genius grew out of the way he combined physical accomplishments with an indomitable spirit."

Alex Lowe Peak 
Formerly known by its elevation as Peak 10,031, Alex Lowe Peak, south of Bozeman, Montana in the Gallatin National Forest was officially named after him in September 2005.  In spring of 1997, Lowe had climbed the northern couloir with friend Hans Saari; and the two had made the first ski-descent from the summit, down what they named "Hellmouth Couloir."

Climbing and skiing resumé

Notable climbs 
 First ascents
 Rakekniven, Queen Maud Land (Antarctica), January 1997
 Great Sail Peak, Baffin Island, 1998
 New routes
 Mount Hunter's Moonflower Buttress, Alaska
 Kwangde Nup, Nepal, 1989
 Kusum Kanguru, Nepal, 1990
 Northwest Chimney, Grand Teton, Wyoming, 1991
 Peak 4810, Ak-Su region, Kyrgyzstan, 1995
 Great Trango Tower, Pakistan, 1999, NW face, new route
 Other climbs
 Matterhorn (Alps, Switzerland)
 K2, Pakistan, China, 1986 (attempt)
 Mount Everest, South Col Route, Nepal, 1990 and 1993 (attempt of its Kangshung Face in 1994)
 Gasherbrum IV, Pakistan, 1992 (attempt)
 Khan Tengri, Kyrgyzstan (August 1993), solo ascent in 10 hours and 8 minutes (broke the former speed climbing record by four hours)
 Aconcagua, Argentina, 1993 and 1994
 Annapurna IV, Nepal, 1996 (attempt)
 Mount Rundle, Canadian Rockies, spring 1996, "Troubled Dreams", first free ascent of one of the most difficult mixed climbs in the Canadian Rockies

Skiing 
 First descents
 Hellmouth Couloir, Alex Lowe Peak (formerly Peak 10,031), Montana, 1997
 Northwest Couloir, Middle Teton, Wyoming, 1992
 Enclosure Couloir, Grand Teton, Wyoming, 1994

See also 
 List of Mount Everest summiters by number of times to the summit

References and notes

External links
 
 Outside magazine, December 1999 Rock Star. Alex Lowe's genius was his style and spirit (Obituary, with list of major ascents). Retrieved March 27, 2010.
 Outside magazine, December 1999 Brightness Falls. Fellow climbers remember, and say good-bye (retrieved March 27, 2010)
 everestnews.com "Alex Lowe Peak": A Mountain Honoring a Mountaineer [with photograph, localization and the climbing history of the peak] (retrieved March 27, 2010)
 Video Tribute to Alex Lowe

 Beyond the Edge: National Geographic Adventure Blog: Alex Lowe’s Son Reflects on Finding Closure Posted by Max Lowe of Nat Geo Young Explorers on May 11, 2016

1958 births
1999 deaths
Sportspeople from Montana
Montana State University alumni
American mountain climbers
Mountaineering deaths
Sport deaths in China
American summiters of Mount Everest
Sportspeople from Frederick, Maryland
Deceased Everest summiters
Deaths in avalanches
Ice climbers